Khursand Kalayeh (also Romanized as Khūrsand Kalāyeh; also known as Khorsand Kalāyeh) is a village in Shuil Rural District, Rahimabad District, Rudsar County, Gilan Province, Iran. At the 2006 census, its population was 14, in 4 families.

References 

Populated places in Rudsar County